Yellow Machinegun was a hardcore punk/heavy metal band formed in 1993 in Osaka, Japan. They produced a demo tape in December 1995. The band released their debut album called Father's Golden Fish on October 21, 1996 for Bandai Music Entertainment. This band has shared the same stage with bands such as Slayer, Motörhead, and Stormtroopers of Death.  The band became dormant in June 2006. They did, however, reunite in Tokyo to play a show with the vocalist's new band, SuziSuzi, in April 2017.

Personnel
 Kaori Okumura (vocals, bass)
 Kyoko Moriya (guitar)
 Tamami Tai Kok (drums)

Discography

Studio albums
 Father's Golden Fish (10/21/96)
 Spot Remover (8/5/98)
 Build & Destroy (9/5/99)
 Bean Ball (12/27/01)
 Yellow Bucket (12/26/02)

Compilation
 SPEAK JAPANESE OR XXX (11/27/00)
 Rotten Speed Hell (4/7/01)
 CROSS-THE STREET (12/16/04)

Split
 ヌンチャクvsイエローマシンガン  Split with Nunchaku
 Seasoning The Obese Split with Stormtroopers of Death  1999
 Split (Yellow Machinegun/Abnormals) Split with Abnormals 2000

DVD Split
 ロッテンオレンジのドーン

References

Musical groups established in 1993
Musical groups from Osaka
Japanese heavy metal musical groups
Japanese punk rock groups